How Late Do U Have 2BB4UR Absent? (How Late Do You Have To Be Before You Are Absent?) is a double album by George Clinton & the P-Funk All-Stars, released  September 6, 2005 on Clinton's label The C Kunspyruhzy. The album also featured release in France on Nocturne Records. It is their first album of new studio material since 1996's T.A.P.O.A.F.O.M. (The Awesome Power Of A Fully Operational Mothership), which was primarily due to a lengthy court battle over ownership of Clinton's recordings.

How Late Do U Have 2BB4UR Absent? features appearances by Prince and Jazze Pha, alongside members of Parliament-Funkadelic. The album is compiled from different sessions over the last decade and is presented as a taste of more new Parliament and Funkadelic material to come. Clinton cited it as "one of the best records we've ever done". Despite mixed criticism towards its indulgent style, How Late Do U Have 2BB4UR Absent? received generally positive reviews from music critics.

Track listing

Disc one

Disc two

Personnel
Credits for How Late Do U Have 2BB4UR Absent? adapted from Allmusic.

 Dallas Austin – producer, instrumentation
 Pedro Bell – artwork
 Barbarella Bishop – management
 Chris Bittner – instrumentation
 Steve Boyd – producer
 Sheila Brody – vocals
 Felicia Collins – instrumentation
 Gary "Mudbone" Cooper – vocals, instrumentation
 Lige Curry – instrumentation
 Raymond Davis – vocals
 Pete Deboer – assistant engineer
 Sue Dog – vocals
 Larry Ferguson – mixing
 Errol Lem – mastering
 Sandra Feva – vocals
 Amp Fiddler – instrumentation
 Kendra Foster – vocals
 Joi Gilliam – vocals
 Michael Hampton – instrumentation
 Clarence "Fuzzy" Haskins – vocals
 Lili Haydn – instrumentation
 Archie Ivy – management
 Jazze Pha – vocals
 Robert "P-Nut" Johnson – vocals
 Joi – performer
 Louis Kabbabie – vocals
 Trey Lewd – vocals
 Pat Lewis – vocals
 Tracey Lewis – vocals, instrumentation
 Rob Manzoli – vocals, producer, instrumentation
 Eric McFadden – instrumentation

 Blackbyrd McKnight – instrumentation
 J.T. Money – vocals
 Jim Morgan – engineer
 Cordell Mosson – instrumentation
 Nate Oberman – engineer
 Clip Payne – vocals, producer, instrumentation
 Michael "Clip" Payne – producer
 Billy Preston – instrumentation
 Prince – vocals, instrumentation
 Jerome Rogers – instrumentation
 Ricky Rouse – instrumentation
 Sativa – performer
 Nowell Eugene Scott aka Nowell Eugene Haskins – instrumentation
 Gary Shider – vocals, producer
 Kevin Shider – vocals
 Tim Shider – instrumentation
 Calvin Simon – vocals
 Bob Smith – engineer
 Ronald Spearman – instrumentation
 RonKat Spearman – vocals
 Joe Spencer – engineer
 David Spradley – instrumentation
 Bob Stovern – layout design
 George Ware – management
 Vaughn Wilson – producer, engineer, instrumentation
 Colin Wolfe – instrumentation
 Belita Woods – vocals
 Bernie Worrell – instrumentation
 Gary Thomas Wright – producer, instrumentation, mixer
 Jim "Big Jim" Wright – vocals
 Ron Wright – instrumentation
 Dwayne "D-Cat" Cornelius - instrumentation
 Martin J. Andersen (credited as Martin Jepsen Anderson) - instrumentation
 Jesper Bunk (credited as Jasper Bunk) - instrumentation

References

External links
 How Late Do U Have 2BB4UR Absent? at Discogs

2005 albums
George Clinton (funk musician) albums
Albums with cover art by Pedro Bell